The so-called Yellow EP is an untitled 12" Gang of Four EP released in 1980 by Warner Bros. It consists of songs issued as singles by EMI Records in the UK. It is known as the Yellow EP because of its sleeve color. All four songs were later included on Infinite Zero Archive/American Recordings's 1995 CD reissue of Entertainment!

Track listing
All songs written and produced by Gang of Four.

Side one
"Outside the Trains Don't Run on Time" – 3:13 (recorded March 1980. A re-recorded version later appeared on Solid Gold in 1981)
"He'd Send in the Army" – 3:39 (recorded March 1980. A re-recorded version later appeared on Solid Gold)

Side two
"It's Her Factory" – 3:07 (recorded March 1979. Originally released as the B-side of the "At Home He's a Tourist" single)
"Armalite Rifle" – 2:48 (recorded June 1979. An earlier version was released in December 1978 as B-side to Gang of Four's 1st single, Damaged Goods, recorded for Fast Product Records)

Personnel
 Dave Allen - bass guitar, vocals
 Hugo Burnham - drums, vocals
 Andy Gill - guitar, vocals
 Jon King - vocals

References

Gang of Four (band) albums
1980 debut EPs